Barrios (Jujuy) is a rural municipality and village in Jujuy Province in Argentina.

Climate

Population
Barrios has a population of 192 according to the 2001 census, which represents an increase of 182% over the previous census in 1991 where the population was 68.

References

Populated places in Jujuy Province